Pointed shoe may refer to the following shoes or fashion boots with very long, pointed toes:

Crakows or Poulaines, 15th- and 16th-century Europe
Winklepickers, 1960s to present, Britain and Germany
Mexican pointy boots, 21st-century Mexico and southern United States

See also
Pointe shoe, worn by ballet dancers